Little Chartiers Creek is a  long 3rd order tributary to Chartiers Creek in Washington County, Pennsylvania.

Course
Little Chartiers Creek rises in South Strabane, Pennsylvania, and then flows northerly to join Chartiers Creek at Van Emman.

Watershed
Little Chartiers Creek drains  of area, receives about 39.0 in/year of precipitation, has a wetness index of 336.87, and is about 51% forested.

See also
 List of rivers of Pennsylvania

References

Rivers of Pennsylvania
Rivers of Washington County, Pennsylvania